The Minnesota Golden Gophers (commonly shortened to Gophers) are the college sports teams of the University of Minnesota. The university fields a total of 25 (12 men's, 13 women's) teams in both men's and women's sports and competes in the Big Ten Conference.

The Gophers women's ice hockey team is a six-time NCAA champion and seven-time national champion. In women's ice hockey, the Gophers belong to the Western Collegiate Hockey Association. In all other sports, they belong to the Big Ten Conference. Most of the facilities that the teams use for training and competitive play are located on the East Bank of the Minneapolis campus. There are arenas for men's and women's basketball (Williams Arena) as well as ice hockey (Mariucci Arena and Ridder Arena). The Gopher football team began playing at TCF Bank Stadium in September 2009. The women's soccer team plays on the St. Paul campus in the Elizabeth Lyle Robbie Stadium.

The Cheerleaders and the Dance Team are also part of the university's athletic department; they are present at events for basketball, ice hockey, and football, and compete for UCA/UDA national titles in the winter. The University of Minnesota spirit squad was the first as sideline cheerleading was invented at the U of M, and it prides itself in being one of the largest spirit squads in the country. The U of M spirit squad currently consists of three cheerleading teams (all girl, coed, and small coed), a dance team, Goldy Gopher, and a unique ice hockey cheerleading team. The dance team won its 19th national title in 2019.

During the 2006–07 academic year, the Golden Gophers wrestling team won the NCAA national championship and the Big Ten team title. The Golden Gophers also won conference championships in men's ice hockey, men's golf, women's rowing, men's swimming and diving, and women's indoor track and field.

Sports sponsored

Baseball 

National Championships (3):
1956, 1960, 1964
NCAA Tournament Appearances (32):
1956, 1958, 1959, 1960, 1964, 1968, 1969, 1970, 1973, 1974, 1976, 1977, 1981, 1982, 1985, 1987, 1988, 1991, 1992, 1993, 1994, 1998, 1999, 2000, 2001, 2003, 2004, 2007, 2009, 2010, 2016, 2018
Big Ten Regular Season Championships (24):
1933, 1935, 1956, 1958, 1959, 1960, 1964, 1968, 1969, 1970, 1973, 1974, 1977, 1982, 1985, 1988, 1992, 2000, 2002, 2003, 2004, 2010, 2016, 2018
Big Ten Conference Tournament Championships (9):
1982, 1985, 1988, 1992, 1998, 2001, 2004, 2010, 2018

Men's basketball 

Big Ten Regular Season Championships (8):
1906, 1907, 1911, 1917, 1919, 1937, 1972, 1982
NCAA Tournament Appearances (10):
1972, 1982, 1989, 1990, 2005, 2009, 2010, 2013, 2017, 2019

Sweet 16 Appearances (3):
1982, 1989, 1990

Elite Eight Appearances (1):
1990

NIT Appearances (12):
1973, 1980, 1981, 1983, 1992, 1993, 2001, 2002, 2003, 2008, 2012, 2014
NIT Championships (2):
1993, 2014

Note: A 1997 Big Ten regular season championship, NCAA Tournament appearances in 1994, 1995, 1997 (Final Four), and 1999, as well as NIT appearances in 1996 and 1998 (Championship) were vacated due to NCAA sanctions.

Women's basketball 

NCAA Tournament Appearances (10):
1994, 2002, 2003, 2004, 2005, 2006, 2008, 2009, 2015, 2018
Sweet 16 Appearances (3):
2003, 2004, 2005
Elite Eight Appearances (1):
2004
Final Four Appearances (1):
2004

Men's cross country 
Big Ten Team Championships (4):
1909, 1914, 1964, 1969

Women's cross country 

Big Ten Team Championships (2):
2007, 2008

Football 

National Championships (7):
1904, 1934, 1935, 1936, 1940, 1941, 1960
Big Ten Conference Championships (18):
1900, 1903, 1904, 1906, 1909, 1910, 1911, 1915, 1927, 1933, 1934, 1935, 1937, 1938, 1940, 1941, 1960, 1967
Intercollegiate Athletic Association of the Northwest Championships (2):
1892, 1893
Bowl Games (20):
Citrus Bowl – 2015
Hall of Fame Classic –1977
Holiday Bowl – 2016
Independence Bowl – 1985
Insight Bowl – 2006, 2008, 2009
Liberty Bowl – 1986
MicronPC.com Bowl – 2000
Music City Bowl – 2002, 2004, 2005
Outback Bowl – 2020
Quick Lane Bowl – 2015, 2018
Meineke Car Care Bowl of Texas – 2012
Rose Bowl – 1961, 1962
Sun Bowl – 1999, 2003
Texas Bowl – 2013
 Bowl game victories: 1962 Rose Bowl, 1985 Independence Bowl, 2002 Music City Bowl, 2003 Sun Bowl, 2004 Music City Bowl, 2015 Quick Lane Bowl, 2016 Holiday Bowl, 2018 Quick Lane Bowl, 2020 Outback Bowl

Traveling trophies 
The Little Brown Jug – Accidentally left in Minnesota back in 1903 by Michigan coach Fielding H. Yost, it is painted with the victories of the two teams.
Floyd of Rosedale – Since 1935 the Gophers and the Iowa Hawkeyes have fought to win this bronze pig. The Gophers won the 2010 and 2011 match up for the pig, upsetting the favored Hawkeyes at TCF Bank Stadium.
Paul Bunyan's Axe – Minnesota and the Wisconsin Badgers have passed this trophy back and forth since 1948, although it records the two teams' encounters since 1890.
Governor's Victory Bell – The bell was created to commemorate the 1993 entrance of Penn State's Nittany Lions into the Big Ten.
$5-Bits-O-Broken-Chair Trophy – The newest of the five trophies. From a 2014 exchange on Twitter, Goldy Gopher created a trophy with a parody account of the then coach of Nebraska Bo Pelini.

Golf 

Men's golf
National Championships (1):
2002
Individual National Champions (2):
1944 – Louis Lick
1998 – James McLean
Big Ten Team Championships (8):
1929, 1938, 1963, 1972, 2002, 2003, 2007 (co-champions), 2014

Women's golf
Big Ten Team Championships (1):
1989

Gymnastics 

Men's gymnastics
Big Ten Team Championships (21):
1903, 1907, 1910, 1925, 1936, 1938, 1940, 1947, 1948, 1949, 1976, 1977, 1978, 1979, 1980, 1982, 1984, 1990, 1991, 1992, 1995

Women's gymnastics
Big Ten Team Championships (5):
1988, 1989, 1991, 1998, 2006

Men's ice hockey 

National Championships (2 pre-NCAA, 5 NCAA):
1929, 1940, 1974, 1976, 1979, 2002, 2003
WCHA Regular Season Championships (14):
1953, 1954, 1970, 1975, 1981, 1983, 1988, 1989, 1992, 1997, 2006, 2007, 2012, 2013
Big Ten Regular Season Championships (4):
2014, 2015, 2016, 2017
Big Ten Tournament Championships (2):
2015, 2021
WCHA Tournament Championships (14):
1961, 1971, 1974, 1975, 1976, 1979, 1980, 1981, 1993, 1994, 1996, 2003, 2004, 2007
NCAA Frozen Four Appearances (21):
1953, 1954, 1961, 1971, 1974, 1975, 1976, 1979, 1981, 1983, 1986, 1987, 1988, 1989, 1994, 1995, 2002, 2003, 2005, 2012, 2014

Women's ice hockey 

National Championships (7):
2000 (AWCHA), 2004, 2005, 2012, 2013, 2015, 2016
WCHA Regular Season Championships (8):
2001, 2002, 2004, 2005, 2009, 2010, 2013, 2014
WCHA Tournament Championships (7):
2002, 2004, 2005, 2012, 2013, 2014, 2015
NCAA Frozen Four Appearances (15):
2002, 2003, 2004, 2005, 2006, 2009, 2010, 2012, 2013, 2014, 2015, 2016, 2017, 2018, 2019

Women's rowing 
Big Ten Championships (1):
2007
NCAA Champions in V2 
2007

Women's soccer 

Big Ten Championships (4):
1995, 1997, 2008, 2016

Softball 

Big Ten Regular Season Championships (4):
1986, 1988, 1991, 2017
Big Ten Tournament Championships (5):
1999, 2014, 2016, 2017, 2018
Women's College World Series appearances (3):
1976, 1978, 2019

Spirit Squads 

Dance Team
National Championships (13):
2003, 2004, 2005, 2006, 2010, 2011, 2012, 2013, 2014, 2015, 2016, 2017, 2019

Swimming 

Men's swimming
Big Ten Team Championships (9):
1922, 1926, 1996, 1998, 2001, 2002, 2004, 2005, 2007

Women's swimming
Big Ten Team Championships (7):
1999, 2000, 2008, 2012, 2013, 2014, 2015

Men's tennis 
Big Ten Team Championships (15):
1910, 1911, 1912, 1918, 1932, 1933, 1981, 1984, 1986, 1989, 1992, 1993, 1994, 1995, 2015

Men's track 

Outdoor track and field
National Championships (1):
1948
Big Ten Team Championships (6):
1949, 1968, 1998, 1999, 2003, 2009, 2010

Indoor track and field
Big Ten Team Championships (4):
1998, 2009, 2010, 2011

Women's track 

Outdoor track and field
Big Ten Team Championships (3):
2006, 2016, 2018

Indoor track and field
Big Ten Team Championships (4):
2007, 2008, 2009, 2018

Volleyball 

Big Ten Championships (3):
2002, 2015, 2018
NCAA Tournament Appearances (21):
1989, 1993, 1996, 1997, 1999, 2000, 2001, 2002, 2003, 2004, 2005, 2006, 2007, 2008, 2009, 2010, 2011, 2012, 2013, 2015, 2016, 2017, 2018

Sweet 16 Appearances (16):
1989, 1993, 1999, 2000, 2001, 2002, 2003, 2004, 2006, 2009, 2010, 2011, 2012, 2013, 2015, 2016
Final Four Appearances (5):
2003, 2004, 2009, 2015, 2016

Wrestling 

National Championships (3):
2001, 2002, 2007
Big Ten Team Championships (12):
1910, 1912, 1913, 1941, 1957, 1959, 1999, 2001, 2002, 2003, 2006, 2007

Notable non varsity sports

Rugby 
Minnesota rugby plays Division I college rugby in the Big Ten Universities conference against traditional Big Ten rivals such as Wisconsin and Iowa. Minnesota qualified for the national playoffs in 2008, and finished the 2008 season ranked 7th in the nation. Some of Minnesota's games have been well attended by fans, with the team drawing as many as 6,000 fans to watch the team play at TCF Bank Stadium.

Traditions

The "Golden" Gophers 
The University Mascot is derived from a nickname for the state of Minnesota, "The Gopher State." The original design was based on the thirteen-lined ground squirrel. The state nickname derives from a political cartoon by R. O. Sweeny, published as a broadside in 1858. The cartoon depicted state legislators as gophers dragging the state in the wrong direction. The nickname was associated with the university as early as the publication of the first yearbook in 1888, which was titled "The Gopher". Other early yearbooks included depictions of gophers as well, and the University of Minnesota football coach Clarence Spears officially named the football team the Gophers in 1926. After the radio announcer Halsey Hall began referring to the team as the Golden Gophers due to the color of their uniforms, the team was renamed under coach Bernie Bierman.

School songs
School songs for the university include Minnesota Rouser, Minnesota March, Go Gopher Victory, Our Minnesota, Minnesota Fight, Hail! Minnesota, and the Battle Hymn of the Republic.

Notable athletes and coaches

Baseball 

John Anderson
Harry Elliott 
Brent Gates
Jack Hannahan
Mark Merila
Paul Molitor
Denny Neagle

Greg Olson
Glen Perkins
Robb Quinlan
Dick Siebert – coach
Terry Steinbach
Dave Winfield (also played basketball at Minnesota)
Dan Wilson

Basketball

Men's
Ron Behagen – Former National Basketball Association (NBA) player
Walter Bond – Former NBA player, and motivational speaker
Randy Breuer – Former NBA player
Jim Brewer (basketball) – Former NBA player
Willie Burton – Former NBA player
Archie Clark – Former NBA player
Louis 'Doc' Cooke, coach (1897–1924)
Bud Grant – Former NBA player, National Football League (NFL) player and longtime Hall of Fame head coach of the Minnesota Vikings
Clem Haskins – coach
Lou Hudson – Former NBA player
Kris Humphries – NBA player
Sam Jacobson – Former NBA player
Bobby Jackson – NBA player
Mark Landsberger – Former NBA player
Voshon Lenard – Former NBA player
Kevin McHale – Naismith Memorial Basketball Hall of Famer and former President of Basketball Operations/head coach of the Houston Rockets

Mark Olberding – Former NBA player
Joel Przybilla – Former NBA player
Flip Saunders – Former NBA head coach
Tubby Smith – Former head coach
John Thomas – Former NBA player
Mychal Thompson – Former NBA player
Trent Tucker – Former NBA player
Ray Williams (basketball) – Former NBA player
Trevor Winter

Women's
Janel McCarville – Former WNBA player for the Minnesota Lynx, New York Liberty, and Charlotte Sting
Lindsay Whalen – Naismith Memorial Basketball Hall of Famer, current Gopher's Women's Basketball Head Coach, and former WNBA player for the Minnesota Lynx and Connecticut Sun
Linda Hill-MacDonald – Former head coach
Rachel Banham - WNBA Player for the Minnesota Lynx
Amanda Zahui B - WNBA Player for the Los Angeles Sparks

Football

Players
Asad Abdul-Khaliq – Quarterback, Chicago Rush
Dominique Barber – Safety, Houston Texans
Marion Barber Jr. – Former National Football League (NFL) running back
Marion Barber III – Running back, Chicago Bears
Bert Baston – All-American, elected to the College Football Hall of Fame in 1954. Awarded Navy Cross in World War I for extraordinary heroism.
Bobby Bell – Pro Football Hall of Famer
Phil Bengtson – Former NFL head coach
Bernie Bierman – Member of the College Football Hall of Fame
McKinley Boston – Former NFL Defensive end/Linebacker
Jack Brewer – Safety, Arizona Cardinals
Win Brockmeyer – Former high school football head coach
Tom Brown- 1960 Outland Trophy winner, member of the College Football Hall of Fame
Gino Cappelletti – Former American Football League (AFL) Wide receiver/Placekicker, AFL all-time leading scorer
Tyrone Carter – Defensive back, San Diego Chargers, 1999 Jim Thorpe Award winner
Tony Dungy – Former NFL safety for Pittsburgh Steelers, former head coach of the Indianapolis Colts & first African-American head coach to win a Super Bowl championship (Super Bowl XLI)
Mark Dusbabek – Former NFL Linebacker
Carl Eller – Pro Football Hall of Famer
Greg Eslinger – Center, Denver Broncos, 2005 Outland Trophy and Rimington Trophy winner
George Gibson – Former NFL offensive guard and head coach
Paul Giel – Member of the College Football Hall of Fame; also was Minnesota's athletic director from 1972 to 1988 and played Major League Baseball
Bud Grant – Pro Football Hall of Famer & Canadian Football Hall of Fame
Ben Hamilton – Offensive guard, Denver Broncos
Ed Hawthorne – Defensive tackle, Miami Dolphins 
Mike Hohensee – Head coach, Chicago Rush
Herb Joesting – Member of the College Football Hall of Fame
Rhys Lloyd – Kicker, Carolina Panthers
Bob McNamara – Former Running Back, Winnipeg Blue Bombers & Denver Broncos
 John McGovern, College Football Hall of Fame, quarterback
Laurence Maroney – Running back, Denver Broncos
Bobby Marshall – One of the first two African-Americans to play in the NFL, member of the College Football Hall of Fame
Karl Mecklenburg – Former NFL linebacker
Willie Middlebrooks – Defensive back, Toronto Argonauts

Bronko Nagurski – Pro Football Hall of Famer (charter member), member of the College Football Hall of Fame
Leo Nomellini – Pro Football Hall of Famer
Derek Rackley – Tight end, Atlanta Falcons
Darrell Reid – Defensive Tackle, Indianapolis Colts
Karon Riley – Defensive end, Washington Redskins
Charlie Sanders – tight end, member of the Pro Football Hall of Fame
Cory Sauter – Former NFL quarterback
Jeff Schuh – Retired Linebacker
Mark Setterstrom – Offensive guard, St. Louis Rams
Bruce Smith – 1941 Heisman Trophy winner, member of the College Football Hall of Fame
Sandy Stephens – First African-American major-college All-American quarterback
Thomas Tapeh – Former NFL fullback
Ryan Thelwell – Wide Receiver, BC Lions
Darrell Thompson – Former NFL running back
Rick Upchurch – Former NFL wide receiver
Ben Utecht – Tight end, Tennessee Titans
Bud Wilkinson – Member of the College Football Hall of Fame
Jeff Wright – Former Minnesota Vikings Defensive back
Eric Decker – Denver Broncos
Marcus Sherels – Minnesota Vikings Cornerback/Punt Returner
Simoni Lawrence – Minnesota Vikings linebacker

Coaches
Bernie Bierman
Tim Brewster
Fritz Crisler
Pudge Heffelfinger
Wesley Fesler
George Hauser
Lou Holtz
Jerry Kill
Glen Mason
William H. Spaulding
Clarence Spears
Jim Wacker
Murray Warmath
Henry L. Williams

Golf
Tom Lehman
James McLean

Gymnastics
Newt Loken
Marie Roethlisberger
John Roethlisberger

Hockey

Men's

Wendell Anderson
Keith Ballard
Kellen Briggs
Herb Brooks
Aaron Broten
Neal Broten
Kris Chucko
Ben Clymer

Mike Crowley
Alex Goligoski
Tim Harrer
Steve Janaszak
Bob Johnson
Phil Kessel
Trent Klatt
Reed Larson
Nick Leddy

Jordan Leopold
Don Lucia
John Mariucci
Paul Martin
John Mayasich
Joe Micheletti
Pat Micheletti
Lou Nanne

Ryan Potulny
Johnny Pohl
Robb Stauber
Jeff Taffe
Thomas Vanek
Phil Verchota
Blake Wheeler
Doug Woog

Women's
Winny Brodt
Natalie Darwitz
Courtney Kennedy
Gisele Marvin
Noora Raty
Jenny Schmidgall-Potter
Krissy Wendell

Swimming
Justin Mortimer

Track and field

Women's
Gabriele Grunewald

Men's
Hassan Mead
Buddy Edelen

NCAA Champions indoor
Ron Backes 1986 (Shot Put, 68–11¼)
Martin Eriksson 1993 (Pole Vault, 18–0½)
Vesa Rantanen 1998 (Pole Vault, 18–2½)
Kaitlyn Long 2018 (Hammer, 76–05.50)

NCAA Champions outdoor
Fortune Gordien 1946 (Discus, 153–10¾)
Fortune Gordien 1947 (Discus, 173–3)
Fortune Gordien 1948 (Discus, 164–0¼)
Garry Bjorklund 1971 (Six Mile, 27:43.1)
Obsa Ali 2017 (3000m steeplechase, 8:32.23)

Wrestling
Shelton Benjamin — professional wrestler, 36–6 record in two seasons with the Gophers.
Verne Gagne – NCAA champion, owner of the defunct American Wrestling Association and its former heavyweight champion (10 times), member of Professional Wrestling Hall of Fame, and several others.
Cole Konrad – 2 time undefeated, NCAA individual champion at 285 lbs; current mixed martial artist and the former Bellator Heavyweight Champion
Nik Lentz, wrestler; current mixed martial artist for the Ultimate Fighting Championship (featherweight)
Brock Lesnar – Former UFC Heavyweight Champion and current WWE champion.
Dustin Schlatter – 79–2 record in two seasons with the Gophers
Jacob Volkmann – 3-time all-American, former UFC fighter.
Gable Steveson - Olympic gold medalist

Athletic directors
Note: From 1974 to 2002, there were separate athletic departments for men and women's sports.

1922–30 Fred Luehring
1930–32 Herbert O. (Fritz) Crisler
1932–41 Frank G. McCormick
1941–45 Lou Keller (acting)
1945–50 Frank G. McCormick
1950–63 Ike J. Armstrong
1963–71 Marshall J. Ryman
1971–88 Paul Giel (men's)
1974–76 Belmar Gunderson (women's)
1976–81 Vivian M. Barfield (women's)
1981–82 M. Catherine Mathison (women's interim)

1982–88 Merrily Dean Baker (women's)
1988–89 Holger Christiansen (men's interim)
1988–2002 Chris Voelz (women's)
1989–91 Rick Bay (men's)
1991–92 Dan Meinert (men's interim)
1992–95 McKinley Boston (men's)
1995–99 Mark Dienhart (men's)
1999–2002 Tom Moe (men's)
2002–2012 Joel Maturi
2012–2015 Norwood Teague
2015–2016 Beth Goetz (interim)
2016-pres Mark Coyle

Facilities

Current facilities
Baseline Tennis Center — tennis
Bierman Track and Field Stadium — track
Elizabeth Lyle Robbie Stadium — women's soccer
Gibson-Nagurski Football Complex
Jane Sage Cowles Stadium — softball
Les Bolstad Golf Course — golf, cross country
3M Arena at Mariucci — men's hockey
Ridder Arena — women's hockey
Siebert Field — baseball
Maturi Pavilion — gymnastics, volleyball, wrestling
TCF Bank Stadium — football
Williams Arena — basketball, wrestling
U of M Boathouse — rowing
Jean K. Freeman University Aquatic Center — swimming and diving
University Fieldhouse

Former facilities
Northrop Field (1899–1923)
Memorial Stadium (1924–1981)
Hubert H. Humphrey Metrodome (1982–2014)

See also
List of college athletic programs in Minnesota

References

External links